Singakutty is a 2008 Indian Tamil-language film starring Shivaji Dev, Gowri Munjal and Malavika. The film did average business in box office.

Plot 
Kadhir joins the police force in accordance with his mother's wish. When he returns home after training, a nightmare awaits him. A terrorist abducts Kadhir's sister, lover and mother.

Cast 
Shivaji Dev as Kathir
Gowri Munjal as Anjali
Vivek as Balu
Avinash
Anal Arasu as Muthu Pandi
Saranya
Malavika as herself (special appearance)
Suja Varunee (special appearance)

Soundtrack 
The soundtrack features a remix of "Aattama Therottama" from Captain Prabhakaran (1991).

Critical reception 
Sify wrote "To put it politely, A.Venkatesh's story and presentation falls flat as he has tried to introduce a raw newcomer as a larger-than-life hero which is hard to stomach and quite irritating." Rediff wrote "Venkatesh's screenplay has the right mix, even if the item and romantic songs prove a headache in their placement. Well aware of what a new hero's launch vehicle should be, he has set out to provide a good fare which satisfies everyone's appetite." Behindwoods wrote "If the story line doesn't sound tiring enough, there is lot more lined up for the whole 150 minutes. Like lackadaisical direction, atrocious editing, tawdry comedy track, and lame music."

References

External links

Indian action films
Films shot in Madurai
2008 action films
2008 films
2000s Tamil-language films